Insensible perspiration is the loss of water through the skin which does not occur as perceivable sweat. Insensible perspiration takes place at an almost constant rate and reflects evaporative loss from the epithelial cells of the skin. Unlike in 
sweating, the fluid lost is pure water, i.e. no solutes are lost. For this reason, it can also be referred to as "insensible water loss".

The amount of water lost in this way is deemed to be approximately 400ml per day. Some sources broaden the definition of insensible perspiration to include not only the water lost through the skin, but also the water lost through the epithelium of the respiratory tract, which is also approximately 400ml per day.

Insensible perspiration is the main source of heat loss from the body, with the figure being placed around 480 kCal per day, which is approximately 25% of basal heat production. Insensible perspiration is not under regulatory control.

History
Known in Latin as perspiratio insensibilis, the concept was already known to Galen in ancient Greece and was studied by the Venetian Santorio Santorio, who experimented on himself and observed that a significant part of the weight of what he ate and drank was not excreted in his faeces or urine but was also not being added to his body weight. He was able to measure the loss through a chair that he designed.

References

Excretion